Khosrow parviz hunting ground (Persian:شکارگاه خسرو پرویز) or Tape-ye-moradhasel (Persian:تپه مرادحاصل) is an ancient Sasanid  complex in north of kermanshah city in west of Iran.

References 

Buildings and structures in Kermanshah Province
Archaeological sites in Iran
Hunting in Iran
Sasanian Empire
History of hunting